Curtis Baptist School (CBS) is a private 1-A Christian high school located in Augusta, Georgia, United States. It is a private school that has more than 300 students in the elementary, middle, and high school combined. The school colors are red and white and the school mascot is "Curtis the Crusader."

History
 The daycare and elementary (K – 6th grade) were established in 1964 by the church.
 7th and 8th grades were added in 1965.
 The 9th grade was added in 1970.
 The remainder of the high school was added and dedicated in 1973.

National Day of Prayer
Although students are regularly found praying before their meals, on May 8, 2009, the Curtis Baptist students took part in the National Day of Prayer. The whole school gathered in the chapel and prayed for many different things, including the school, state, and nation. Prominent figures from the Augusta area such as mayor Dr. David Minter, and local radio station host Cleve Walker, gathered at the school to pray.

Headmaster has lunch on roof
On February 4, 2010, then-headmaster Bill Peavey, ate lunch on the roof of the school with his wife, Kitty, because of a reading goal that was met and surpassed by the elementary school students.

Learning Place
The Learning Place was created for students grades 1-12 who have various learning disabilities such as attention deficit disorder, attention deficit hyperactive disorder, and disabilities in reading comprehension, oral expression, listening, written expression, math calculation, math reasoning, or basic reading skills. Students with average or above average intelligence may struggle in just one or multiple areas, and this program is meant to help them learn in a unique environment designed specifically for them.

Elementary school
Students take part in daily Bible lessons and participate in chapel once a week. The Stanford Achievement Test is administered every year, and the students' performance is substantially higher than the national and regional averages.

Middle school

High school
The high school curriculum is college preparatory composed of mainly  math, science, and literature classes. A Biblical element is integrated into the curriculum. Students have daily in-class Bible studies and also attend weekly worship service.

Athletics
About 90% of Curtis students participate in athletics. The school offers a variety of middle school, junior varsity, and varsity level teams.

Championships
Region Championships
 
 Boys' soccer: 1975
 Golf: 1980, 1981
 Boys' cross country: 1997, 1998, 1999, 2000
 Girls' cross country: 1997, 1998
 Girls' tennis: 1984
 Softball: 1981, 1984
 Boys' track: 1997, 1998
 Girls' track: 2007
 Baseball: 1979, 1984
 Boys' basketball: 1976, 1981, 1983, 1996, 1997, 2000, 2007, 2023
 Girls' basketball: 1976, 1997, 2015, 2016, 2017, 2018, 2019, 2021, 2022, 2023
 Girls' volleyball: 2020, 2021

State Runner-Up

 Softball: 1981
 Boys' soccer: 1982

State Championships

 Boys' soccer: 1980
 Softball: 1982
 Boys' basketball: 1994, 1997, 2013, 2014
 Girls' basketball: 1996

References

External links
 Official website

1964 establishments in Georgia (U.S. state)
Baptist schools in the United States
Christian schools in Georgia (U.S. state)
Educational institutions established in 1964
Private schools in Richmond County, Georgia
Private high schools in Georgia (U.S. state)
Private middle schools in Georgia (U.S. state)
Private elementary schools in Georgia (U.S. state)
Preparatory schools in Georgia (U.S. state)
Schools accredited by the Southern Association of Colleges and Schools